Vladni is a village in the municipality of Tuzi, Montenegro. It is located southwest of Tuzi town.

Demographics
According to the 2011 census, its population was 474.

References

Populated places in Tuzi Municipality
Albanian communities in Montenegro